Teresa Piruzza (born ) is a former politician in Ontario, Canada. She was a Liberal member of the Legislative Assembly of Ontario from 2011 to 2014 who represented the southwestern riding of Windsor West. She was a cabinet minister in the government of Kathleen Wynne.

Background
Piruzza grew up in Windsor, Ontario. She attended the University of Windsor where she obtained a BA in international relations and an MBA. She worked for the municipality as an executive director. She lives in Windsor with her husband John and their two sons.

Politics
Piruzza has a long association with the Ontario Liberal Party. She worked on campaigns for Herb Gray, former Windsor-Sandwich MPP Bill Wrye, and was the campaign manager for Sandra Pupatello in both 1995 and 1999. She also worked as Pupatello's constituency assistant before starting a successful career in the public sector.

In the 2011 provincial election, Piruzza ran as the Liberal candidate in the riding of Windsor West after Pupatello announced her retirement. She won the riding by 3,583 votes over NDP rival Helmi Charif. Shortly after being elected she was appointed parliamentary assistant to both the Minister of Citizenship and Immigration and the Minister Responsible for Women’s Issues. Following the 2013 Ontario Liberal Party leadership convention, Piruzza was appointed Minister of Children and Youth Services by new Premier Kathleen Wynne.

She was defeated in the 2014 election by New Democrat Lisa Gretzky. Following her defeat, there was some speculation that she would announce her candidacy for Mayor of Windsor, Ontario in the city's 2014 municipal election, but she announced on August 8 that she was joining Chrysler Canada in an executive role.

Cabinet positions

Election results

References

External links

1968 births
21st-century Canadian politicians
21st-century Canadian women politicians
Living people
Members of the Executive Council of Ontario
Ontario Liberal Party MPPs
Politicians from Windsor, Ontario
Women government ministers of Canada
Women MPPs in Ontario
University of Windsor alumni